Clare Best is a British poet, author and university lecturer who was both shortlisted for the 2012 Seamus Heaney Centre Prize for "Excisions" and a finalist for the 2014 Mslexia Memoir Competition for "The Missing List".

Bibliography
Treasure Ground (HappenStance Press, 2010)
Excisions (Waterloo Press, 2011)
Breastless (Pighog, 2011)
Cell (Frogmore Press, 2015)
Springlines (Little Toller Books, 2017)
The Missing List — a memoir (Linen Press, 2018)
Each Other (Waterloo Press, 2019)

Award nominations
 Seamus Heaney Centre Prize (2012)
 Mslexia Memoir Competition (2014)

References

See also
 Official website

Living people
Year of birth missing (living people)
21st-century English women writers
English women poets